The Cooper's Bluff Site is a prehistoric panel of pictographs (painted rock art) in Searcy County, Arkansas. It is estimated to have been painted about 1500 CE.

The site was listed on the National Register of Historic Places in 1982.

See also
National Register of Historic Places listings in Searcy County, Arkansas

References

Archaeological sites on the National Register of Historic Places in Arkansas
Searcy County, Arkansas
Rock art in North America
National Register of Historic Places in Searcy County, Arkansas